The early Norwegian black metal scene of the 1990s is credited with creating the modern black metal genre and produced some of the most acclaimed and influential artists in extreme metal. It attracted massive media attention when it was revealed that its members had been responsible for two murders, a suicide, and a wave of church burnings in Norway.

The scene had an ethos and the core members referred to themselves as "The Black Circle" or "Black Metal Inner Circle". It consisted primarily of young men, many of whom gathered at the record shop Helvete ("Hell") in Oslo. In interviews, they voiced extreme anti-Christian and misanthropic views, presenting themselves as a cult-like group of militant Satanists who wanted to spread terror, hatred and evil. They adopted pseudonyms and appeared in photographs wearing "corpse paint" and wielding medieval weaponry. The scene was exclusive and created boundaries around itself, incorporating only those it deemed to be "trve" or committed. Musical integrity was highly important and artists wanted black metal to remain underground and uncorrupted.

In August 1993, several of its members were arrested and in May 1994 were convicted variously for arson, murder, assault and possession of explosives. Most showed no remorse for their actions at the time. The Norwegian media covered events closely, but the reporting was often sensationalist. Some referred to them as "Satanic terrorists" and one Norwegian TV channel interviewed a woman who claimed Satanists had sacrificed her child and killed her dog. The early Norwegian black metal scene has since been the subject of books and documentaries.

Musical innovations 

During the 1980s, black metal was a loose grouping of a handful of heavy metal bands who shared Satanic lyrics, although most of the "first wave" bands referred to Satanism only for shock value. During 1990–1992, a number of Norwegian artists, who were strongly influenced by those bands, began performing and releasing a new kind of black metal music. The surge of interest and popularity that followed is often referred to as the "second wave of black metal". The Norwegian bands developed the style of their 1980s forebears as a distinct genre of heavy metal music. This was partly thanks to a new style of guitar playing developed by Snorre "Blackthorn" Ruch of Stigma Diabolicum/Thorns and Øystein "Euronymous" Aarseth of Mayhem, in which guitarists played full chords using all the strings of the guitar in place of power chords, which use only two or three strings. Gylve "Fenriz" Nagell of Darkthrone has credited them with this innovation in a number of interviews. He described it as being "derived from Bathory" and noted that "those kinds of riffs became the new order for a lot of bands in the '90s". Black metal music also became much more satanic and the term 'TRVE KVLT Black Metal' has since become the term for satanic-leaning black metal.

Visually, the dark themes of their music were complemented with corpse paint, which became a way for black metal artists to distinguish themselves from other metal bands of the time, yet some bands such as Emperor and Satyricon ceased wearing corpse paint, often citing its loss of meaning or trendiness due to use by so many bands.

Dead's suicide 
On 8 April 1991, Mayhem vocalist and lyricist Per Yngve Ohlin (known by the stage name "Dead") committed suicide via shotgun blast while alone in a house shared by the band. Fellow musicians described Dead as odd, introverted and depressed. For performances, he made himself look like a corpse and would self-harm while performing.

Dead was found by Mayhem guitarist Euronymous with his wrists and throat slit and a gunshot wound to his forehead. Before calling the police, Euronymous got a camera and photographed the body after re-arranging some items. One of these photographs was later used as the cover of a bootleg live album: Dawn of the Black Hearts.

Euronymous used Dead's suicide to foster Mayhem's "evil" image and claimed Dead had killed himself because black metal had become "trendy" and commercialized. He made necklaces which he claimed as being made with bits of Dead's skull and gave them to musicians he deemed worthy. There was also a false rumor that he had made a stew with bits of Dead's brain.

Mayhem bassist Jørn 'Necrobutcher' Stubberud noted that "people became more aware of the black metal scene after Dead had shot himself [...]; I think it was Dead's suicide that really changed the scene." The suicide caused a rift between Euronymous and some of his friends, especially Necrobutcher, who were disgusted by his attitude towards Dead. Some claimed Euronymous "went into a fantasy world" and "tried to be as extreme as he had talked about".

Two other members of the scene would later commit suicide: Erik 'Grim' Brødreskift (of Immortal, Borknagar, Gorgoroth) in 1999 and Espen 'Storm' Andersen (of Strid) in 2001.

Helvete, ideology, and the "Black Circle" 

Mayhem guitarist Euronymous was "the central figure involved in the formation of the Norwegian black metal scene", which he "almost single-handedly founded". During May–June 1991, he opened a record shop called Helvete (Norwegian for "Hell"). The shop was at Schweigaards gate 56 in Oslo. Norwegian black metal musicians often met at the shop and in its basement. They included the members of Mayhem, the members of Emperor, Varg "Count Grishnackh" Vikernes of Burzum, and Snorre "Blackthorn" Ruch of Thorns. Euronymous also founded an independent record label called Deathlike Silence Productions, which was based at Helvete. It released albums by Norwegian bands Mayhem and Burzum, Swedish bands Merciless and Abruptum, and a Japanese band Sigh. Euronymous, Varg, and Emperor guitarist Tomas "Samoth" Haugen lived in the shop at various times. Emperor drummer Bård "Faust" Eithun also lived and worked there. The shop's walls were painted black and bedecked with medieval weapons, posters of bands, and picture discs, while its window featured a polystyrene tombstone.

During the time it was open, Helvete was the focal point of the Norwegian black metal scene. Jon "Metalion" Kristiansen, writer of the fanzine Slayer, said that the opening of Helvete was "the creation of the whole Norwegian Black Metal scene". Daniel Ekeroth wrote in 2008,

Those who gathered at Helvete have been referred to as the "Black Circle" or "Black Metal Inner Circle", a name allegedly invented by Euronymous. Euronymous presented the "Black Circle" as an organized, cult-like group of militant Satanists whose activities were funded by his record shop, and a 1993 Kerrang! article referred to them as "Satanic terrorists". Faust later said that it was "just a name that was invented for the people who hung around the shop ... there wasn't anything like members and membership cards and official meetings." Likewise, in his review of Lucifer Rising, Varg Vikernes said, "The so-called 'Black Circle' was something Euronymous made up because he wanted to make people believe there was such a thing, but it was nonsense and never existed. The media on the other hand believed it existed for a while, but quickly stopped talking about it when they understood it was a fake rumor."

According to Stian "Occultus" Johannsen, the space that Euronymous rented "was far too big and the rent was too high. That's the reason why it never did well." Only a small part of the building was used for the shop itself. Euronymous shut Helvete in early 1993 when it began to draw the attention of the police and media. The store has since been reopened under the name Neseblod Records, in the same location but with much less floor space. ('Neseblod' is Norwegian for 'nosebleed'.) Many of the original artifacts still remain, and the store also identifies as a "black metal museum".

The Norwegian black metal scene was bitterly opposed to Christianity and organized religion as a whole. In interviews during the early 1990s, Euronymous and other members of the scene presented themselves as militant misanthropic Devil worshippers who wanted to spread hatred, sorrow and evil. They attacked the Church of Satan for being too "humane". The theistic Satanism they espoused was an inversion of Christianity. Euronymous was the key figure behind this ideology. He professed to be in favor of totalitarianism and against compassion, peace, happiness and fun. When asked why such statements were made to the press, Ihsahn of Emperor said, "I think that was very much to create fear among people." He added that the scene "wanted to be in opposition to society" and "tried to concentrate more on just being 'evil' than having a real Satanic philosophy". Vikernes said that the reason they claimed to advocate "evil" was to provoke.

According to the book Lords of Chaos, many who knew Euronymous say that "the extreme Satanic image he projected was, in fact, just that – a projection which bore little resemblance to his real personality." They include Necrobutcher, Kjetil Manheim, Vikernes, and Blackthorn (the latter two were convicted for his murder). Faust said that with Euronymous, "there was a lot of smoke but not so much fire." Mortiis, however, said that Euronymous "was such a devil worshipper you wouldn't believe it", and Metalion (who knew Euronymous since 1985 and considered him to be his best friend) said Euronymous "was always telling what he thought ... worshipping death and being extreme." As for the other scene members, Samuel Fridh says there is no evidence to support their early claims of being Devil worshippers, and Leif A. Lier, who led the police investigation after Euronymous's death, said he and his men had not met one Satanist. Faust said that "For some people it [Satanism] was bloody serious, but to a lot of them it was all a big hype."

In retrospect, Metalion wrote, "In the past, people just wrote about Satan, but now people meant it. I believe it was serious—maybe not all the Satanism, but definitely the approach to the music and the lifestyle. It was certainly more destructive than metal had been in the past." Tenebris from the Misanthropic Luciferian Order (a Swedish Satanic order) wrote that the Norwegian scene "meant a lot as long as it lasted. Back then, in 1991, things mainly concerned black metal and ideological Satanism (not so much practical Satanism, but anyway ...) ... It grew quickly to become a sort of black metal army ... and kind of stood and fell with Euronymous and his shop. Therefore, it vanished with his death in '93 ... Sadly enough, many people involved at the time betrayed their ideals and lost their interest when things fell apart. Like it was nothing more than a hype of temporary nature."

Regarding the term "black metal", Euronymous said that it applies to any heavy metal band who are theistic Satanists and write Satanic lyrics. Such ideas were repeated by other scene members, such as Faust. At the time, bands with a style similar to Norwegian black metal, but without Satanic lyrics, tended to use other terms for their music.

Some bands in the scene were interested in pre-Christian Norway and its traditions, and there was an undercurrent of romantic nationalism in the scene. Some scene members also flirted with Nazi imagery, but this was largely an attempt to provoke. In a private letter written in the early 1990s, Euronymous claimed that "almost all" Norwegian black metal bands at the time were "more or less Nazis". He was interested in totalitarian communist states and said he wished to see people "rot under communist dictatorship". However, apart from Varg Vikernes, the scene was largely non-political.

Church arsons and attempts 

In 1992, members of the Norwegian black metal scene began a wave of arson attacks on Christian churches. By 1996, there had been at least 50 attacks in Norway; in every case that was solved, those responsible were black metal fans. Some of the buildings were hundreds of years old and seen as important historical landmarks. The first was Norway's Fantoft Stave Church, which was burnt to the ground in June 1992. Police believe Varg Vikernes of Burzum was responsible. The cover of Burzum's EP Aske ("ashes") is a photograph of the destroyed church. On 16 May 1994, Vikernes was found guilty for burning down the Holmenkollen Chapel, Skjold Church, and Åsane Church. In addition, he was found guilty for an attempted arson of a fourth church, and for the theft and storage of 150 kg of explosives. Members of the Swedish black metal scene started to burn churches as well in 1993.

To coincide with the release of Mayhem's De Mysteriis Dom Sathanas, Vikernes and Euronymous had allegedly plotted to bomb the Nidaros Cathedral, which appears on the album cover. The musicians Faust, Samoth, (both of Emperor), and Jørn Inge Tunsberg (of Hades Almighty) were also convicted for church arsons. Those convicted for church burnings showed no remorse and described their actions as a symbolic "retaliation" against Christianity in Norway. Mayhem drummer Hellhammer said he had called for attacks on mosques and Hindu temples, on the basis that they were more foreign. Today, opinions on the church burnings differ within the black metal community. Many musicians, singers, and songwriters in the early Norwegian black metal scene, such as Infernus and Gaahl of Gorgoroth, continue to praise the church burnings, with the latter saying "there should have been more of them, and there will be more of them." Others, such as Necrobutcher and Kjetil Manheim of Mayhem and Abbath of Immortal, see the church burnings as having been futile. Manheim claimed that many arsons were "just people trying to gain acceptance" within the black metal scene. Watain vocalist Erik Danielsson respected the attacks, but said of those responsible: "the only Christianity they defeated was the last piece of Christianity within themselves. Which is a very good beginning, of course."

The following is a partial list of the church arsons:

1992
23 May: attempted burning of Storetveit Church in Bergen.
6 June: burning of Fantoft stave church in Bergen – Varg Vikernes is strongly suspected as the culprit, but was not convicted.
1 August: burning of Revheim Church in Stavanger.
21 August: burning of Holmenkollen Chapel in Oslo – Varg Vikernes and Faust were convicted for this; Euronymous also participated, but was murdered in August 1993.
1 September: burning of Ormøya Church in Oslo.
13 September: burning of Skjold Church in Vindafjord – Varg Vikernes and Samoth were convicted for this.
3 October: burning of Hauketo Church in Oslo.
24 December: burning of Åsane Church in Bergen – Varg Vikernes and Jørn Inge Tunsberg were convicted for this.
25 December: burning of a Methodist church in Sarpsborg – a firefighter was killed while fighting this fire.
1993
7 February: burning of Lundby New Church in Gothenburg, Sweden.
1994
13 March: burning of a church in Sund.
27 March: burning of Seegård Church in Snertingdal.
16 May: attempted burning of Gol stave church in Buskerud.
17 May: attempted burning of Åmodt Chapel in Buskerud.
4 June: burning of Frogn Church in Drøbak.
19 June: attempted burning of Heni Church in Gjerdrum.
7 July: burning of a church in Jeløy.
21 July: attempted burning of Odda's Church.
13 August: attempted burning of Loop Chapel in Meldal.
10 December: attempted burning of Åkra Church.
22 December: attempted burning of Askim Church.
26 December: attempted burning of Klemestrud Church.
1995
13 May: burning of Lord Church in Telemark.
25 May: burning of Såner Church in Vestby.
14 June: burning of Moe Church in Sandefjord.
21 July: attempted burning of a church college in Eidanger.
3 September: attempted burning of Vågsbygd church college in Kristiansand.
3 November: burning of Innset Church in Rennebu.

Murder of Magne Andreassen 
On 21 August 1992, Bård "Faust" Eithun killed Magne Andreassen, a gay man, in Lillehammer. According to Faust, while walking home at night, a man sexually proposed to him and Faust agreed to walk with him to the Olympic park. Once in the woods, Faust stabbed Andreassen 37 times, and then kicked him in the head repeatedly as he lay on the ground.

Faust claimed he felt no remorse at the time. In the late 1990s, he said of the murder, "I was outside, just waiting to get out some aggression. It's not easy to describe why it happened. It was meant to happen, and if it was this man or another man, that's not really important." Ihsahn, his bandmate in Emperor, said Faust "had been very fascinated by serial killers for a long time, and I guess he wanted to know what it's like to kill a person." The media linked the murder to black metal, Satanism and fascism. In a 2008 interview, Faust said, "I was never a Satanist or fascist in any way, but I put behind me the hatred and negativity. Those feelings just eat you up from inside."

Police initially had no suspects, and Faust remained free for about a year. However, he told Euronymous, Vikernes and a few others what he had done. The day after the stabbing, he returned to Oslo and allegedly burnt down Holmenkollen Chapel with Vikernes and Euronymous. After Euronymous' murder in August 1993, Faust was arrested and confessed to Andreassen's murder. In 1994, he was sentenced to 14 years' imprisonment, but was released in 2003.

Bergens Tidende article 
In January 1993, an article in one of Norway's biggest newspapers, Bergens Tidende (BT), brought the black metal scene into the media spotlight. Two friends of Vikernes interviewed him and brought the interview to the newspaper, hoping they would print it. In the anonymous interview, "Count Grishnackh" (Vikernes) claimed to have burnt the churches and killed a man in Lillehammer. BT journalist Finn Bjørn Tønder set up a meeting with "Count Grishnackh". The journalists were summoned to an apartment and, allegedly, warned they would be shot if the police were called. There, Vikernes and his companions told the journalists that they had burnt the churches, or knew who had done it, and warned the attacks would continue. They claimed to be Devil worshippers and said, "Our intention is to spread fear and evil."

They told the journalists details about the arsons that had not been released to the press and so BT spoke with the police before publishing it, who confirmed these details. The article was published on 20 January as the front page of the BT. It was headlined  ("We set the churches on fire") and included a photo of Vikernes, his face mostly hidden, holding two large knives. However, by the time the article was printed, Vikernes had already been arrested. The police allegedly found him by going to an address printed on a Burzum flyer, although Vikernes believes that Tønder betrayed him.

According to Vikernes, the anonymous interview was planned by him and Euronymous with the goal of spreading fear, promoting black metal and getting more customers for Helvete. Vikernes said of the interview, "I exaggerated a lot and when the journalist left we ... had a good laugh, because he didn't seem to understand that I was pulling his leg." He added that the interview revealed nothing that could prove his involvement in any crime. Vikernes claims that, after he was arrested, "the journalist edited the interview and ... published an insane version of it the following day, without even letting me read through it." Some of the other scene members were also arrested and questioned, but all were released for lack of evidence.

Euronymous decided to shut Helvete as it began to draw the attention of the police and media. Vikernes condemned Euronymous for shutting the shop rather than taking advantage of the publicity, stating, "by doing so he also made all my efforts more or less pointless. I spent six weeks in custody because of that." Norwegian magazine Rock Furore published an interview with Vikernes in February 1993. In it, he said of the prison system, "It's much too nice here. It's not hell at all. In this country prisoners get a bed, toilet and shower. It's completely ridiculous. I asked the police to throw me in a real dungeon, and also encouraged them to use violence." He was released in March for lack of evidence.

Shortly after this episode, the Oslo police dispatched its Church Fire Group to Bergen, where they set up a makeshift headquarters in the Hotel Norge. According to Lords of Chaos, citing a police report, Vikernes knocked on their door and "virtually forced his way into the suite". He was "dressed in chain mail, carrying two large knives in his belt, and flanked by the two young men who apparently behaved as if they were his bodyguards or henchmen." Vikernes "stated that he was fed up with being harassed by the authorities, and that the police investigation into the Black Metal scene should be stopped." When police told him he had no right to issue orders, Vikernes "took one step back and raised his right arm in a Roman salute."

Murder of Euronymous 

In early 1993, animosity arose between Euronymous and Vikernes. On the night of 10 August 1993, Vikernes and Snorre 'Blackthorn' Ruch drove from Bergen to Euronymous' apartment in Oslo. When they arrived there was a confrontation and Vikernes stabbed Euronymous to death. His body was found outside the apartment with 23 cut wounds – two to the head, five to the neck, and 16 to the back.

It has been speculated that the murder was the result of a power struggle, a financial dispute over Burzum records, or an attempt at "outdoing" the stabbing in Lillehammer. Vikernes denies this and claims he killed Euronymous in self-defense. He says Euronymous had plotted to stun him with an electroshock weapon, tie him up and torture him to death while filming the event, using a meeting about an unsigned contract to ambush him. Vikernes claims he intended to hand Euronymous the signed contract that night and "tell him to fuck off", but that Euronymous panicked and attacked him first. The self-defense story is doubted by Faust, while Necrobutcher believes Vikernes killed Euronymous due to the death threats he received from him. Necrobutcher later alleged that he also intended to murder Euronymous himself due to him tastelessly capitalizing on Dead's suicide.

Vikernes was arrested on 19 August 1993, and many other members of the scene were taken in for questioning around the same time. Some confessed to their crimes and implicated others. In May 1994, Vikernes was sentenced to 21 years in prison (Norway's maximum penalty) for the murder of Euronymous, the arson of four churches, and for possession of 150 kg of explosives. Two churches were burned the day he was sentenced, "presumably as a statement of symbolic support". Blackthorn was sentenced to eight years in prison for being an accomplice to the murder. That month saw the release of the Mayhem album De Mysteriis Dom Sathanas, which features Euronymous on guitar and Vikernes on bass guitar. Euronymous's family had asked Mayhem's drummer, Hellhammer, to remove the bass tracks recorded by Vikernes, but Hellhammer said, "I thought it was appropriate that the murderer and victim were on the same record." Vikernes was released from prison in 2009.

Conflict with other music scenes 
There was a strong rivalry between Norwegian black metal and Swedish death metal scenes. Fenriz and Tchort have noted that Norwegian black metal musicians had become "fed up with the whole death metal scene" and that "death metal was very uncool in Oslo" at the time. A number of times, Euronymous sent death threats to some of the more 'mainstream' death metal groups in Europe. Allegedly, a group of Norwegian black metal fans even plotted to kidnap and murder certain Swedish death metal musicians.

There was also rivalry between Norwegian and Finnish black metal bands. Impaled Nazarene printed "No orders from Norway accepted" and "" ('Death to the arseholes of Norway!') on early pressings of their first album and innuendo and snarky comments were made in fanzines. Beherit's mainman 'Nuclear Holocausto' used the rivalry to play a series of telephone pranks on Mika Luttinen (of Impaled Nazarene) in which he would call him in the dead of the night playing nursery rhymes at high speed on a cassette recorder. At the time, Luttinen maintained that the messages were threats from Norwegian black metallers. The Finnish band Black Crucifixion criticized the Norwegian band Darkthrone as "trendies" due to Darkthrone originally being a death metal band who later played black metal.

List of music releases 
The following is a list of black metal recordings and releases by the aforesaid bands released during 1987–1993. Releases in bold are albums, while the rest are demos and extended plays.

Documentaries and films 
 Det svarte alvor (1994).
 Satan rir Media (English: Satan Rides the Media) (1999).
 Norsk Black Metal (2003), aired on Norwegian TV by the Norwegian Broadcasting Corporation (NRK).
 Metal: A Headbanger's Journey (2005) touches on black metal in the early 1990s, and includes an extensive 25-minute feature on the DVD release.
 Black Metal: A Documentary (2006), produced by Bill Zebub.
 Murder Music: A History of Black Metal (2007).
 Once Upon a Time in Norway (2007).
 Pure Fucking Mayhem (2008).
 Black Metal: The Norwegian Legacy (2008), produced by Bill Zebub.
 Until the Light Takes Us (2009).
 Black Metal: The Music of Satan (2010), produced by Bill Zebub.
 Lords of Chaos (2018), film directed by Jonas Åkerlund.
 Helvete – historien om norsk black metal (2020).

See also 

 List of musicians in the early Norwegian black metal scene

References

Bibliography

External links 
 "In the Face of Death" – article about the early Norwegian black metal scene, focusing on Mayhem (2005)

Black metal
Music scenes
Social history of Norway
Cultural history of Norway
Anti-Christian sentiment in Europe
Heavy metal by location
Mayhem (band)